The Sault Ste. Marie Railroad Bridge was originally built in 1887 to facilitate rail traffic crossing St. Marys River and the international border between Sault Ste. Marie, Michigan and Sault Ste. Marie, Ontario.  It runs parallel to the Sault Ste. Marie International Bridge.  It has nine Camelback spans and carries a single line of track.

See also

 Buffalo and Fort Erie Public Bridge Authority – public, Peace Bridge
 Detroit International Bridge Company – private, Ambassador Bridge
 Niagara Falls Bridge Commission – public, Lewiston-Queenston Bridge, Whirlpool Rapids Bridge and Rainbow Bridge
 Thousand Islands Bridge Authority – public, Thousand Islands Bridge
 Windsor-Detroit Bridge Authority – public, Gordie Howe International Bridge

References

External links

Historic Bridges Org, Sault Ste. Marie Railroad Bridge, photos, maps and links

Bascule bridges in the United States
Buildings and structures in Sault Ste. Marie, Michigan
Buildings and structures in Sault Ste. Marie, Ontario
Canada–United States bridges
Historic American Engineering Record in Michigan
Plate girder bridges in the United States
Railroad bridges in Michigan
Railway bridges in Ontario
St. Marys River (Michigan–Ontario)
Swing bridges in Canada
Vertical lift bridges in the United States
Rail transport in Sault Ste. Marie, Ontario